KKIT (95.9 FM) is a radio station broadcasting a Top 40/CHR music format. The station, located in Taos, New Mexico, is owned by L.M.N.O.C. Broadcasting LLC.

References

External links

KIT
Mass media in Taos, New Mexico
Radio stations established in 2006
2006 establishments in New Mexico